Marie-Hélène Crombé-Berton (born 1960) is a Belgian politician and a member of the MR. She was elected as a member of the Belgian Senate in 2007.

Notes

Living people
Members of the Senate (Belgium)
1960 births